The 2017 Nebraska Danger season was the seventh season for the Nebraska Danger as a professional indoor football franchise and their seventh in the Indoor Football League (IFL). One of ten teams that competed in the IFL for the 2017 season, the Nebraska Danger were members of the Intense Conference. For the first time ever, the team played their home games under head coach Hurtis Chinn who took over for Mike Davis. The Danger played in the Eihusen Arena at the Heartland Events Center in Grand Island, Nebraska.

Staff

Schedule
Key:

Regular season
All start times are local time

Standings

Postseason

Roster

References

External links
 Nebraska Danger official statistics

Nebraska Danger
Nebraska Danger
Nebraska Danger